News Corp UK & Ireland Limited (trading as News UK, formerly News International and NI Group) is a British newspaper publisher, and a wholly owned subsidiary of the American mass media conglomerate News Corp. It is the current publisher of The Times, The Sunday Times, and The Sun newspapers; its former publications include the Today, News of the World, and The London Paper newspapers. Until June 2002, it was called News International plc. On 31 May 2011, the company name was changed from News International Limited to NI Group Limited, and on 26 June 2013 to News UK.

History
Between 1987 and 1995, News International owned, through its subsidiary News (UK) Ltd, Today, the first UK national newspaper to be printed in colour. All of News International's newspapers (with the exception of The London Paper, launched in 2006) were founded by other owners, in some cases hundreds of years ago.

In October 2005, News International sold TSL Education, publisher of Times Higher Education, Times Educational Supplement, and other education titles, for £235m ($415m). The Times Literary Supplement, previously part of TSL Education, was retained by News International as part of the deal. Darwin Ltd, which had taken over the company, continued to produce the same product.

Phone hacking allegations

In July 2009, The Guardian, a newspaper owned by Guardian Media Group, reported that News Group Newspapers paid in excess of £1m to settle legal cases that threatened to reveal News Group journalists' use on repeated occasions of illegal methods in the pursuit of stories. It has been alleged that News Group staff were accused of engaging in phone hacking, including Clive Goodman, illegally accessed voicemail for the mobile phones of thousands of public figures, including politicians and celebrities. Goodman was jailed in 2007 for tapping the mobile phones of three members of the royal staff; this is an offence under the Regulation of Investigatory Powers Act. It was stated by News International at the time that Goodman had acted without its knowledge, and that no other News International journalists made use of such methods.

The evidence uncovered by The Guardian showed that many more figures were in fact the subject of phone-taps, including Nigella Lawson, Lenny Henry, Gwyneth Paltrow, John Prescott, Boris Johnson, and Tessa Jowell. In 2008, the News of the World paid in excess of £400,000 in damages to Gordon Taylor, the chief executive of the Professional Footballers' Association, who was suing the newspaper for its involvement in the illegal interception of messages to his mobile phone. According to The Guardian, this payment, made in exchange for Taylor's silence, "prevented the public from knowing anything about the hundreds of pages of evidence which had been disclosed in Taylor's case".

In contrast to News International's earlier denials of knowledge, The Guardian cites suppressed evidence revealing that News of the Worlds editorial staff were involved with private investigators who engaged in illegal phone-hacking, and that both reporters and executives were commissioning purchases of confidential information; this is illegal unless it is shown to be in the public interest. Apparently these activities were well known within the News of the World, being "openly paid for by the accounts department with invoices which itemised illegal acts". The paperwork was alleged to show the above occurred during the tenure of Andy Coulson, who was chief press advisor to David Cameron, leader of the UK's Conservative Party, until his resignation on 21 January 2011.

On 4 July, The Guardian reported that a private investigator at the News of the World had hacked into the phone of murdered teenager Milly Dowler, causing both her parents and police investigating her murder to wrongly believe she was still alive. This occurred during the period that Rebekah Brooks (née Wade) was editor.

On 7 July, British newspaper The Daily Telegraph alleged that the families of dead British service personnel were targeted by private investigators working for the News of the World. This led to The Royal British Legion severing ties with the paper until such allegations are proved false. On the same day, James Murdoch announced the News of the World would be shut down after the publication of one more edition on 10 July 2011, due to the allegations. The newspaper had already been faced with the withdrawal of a number of sponsors which had advertised their products and services in the newspaper, not to mention the inevitable fall in sales that the newspaper would have faced had it remained in circulation.

On 15 July, Rebekah Brooks resigned as chief executive of News International. She commented thus on her departure:

Rebekah Brooks £10m payout
The Guardian newspaper, citing official company accounts, claims Brooks received a £10.8m payoff for leaving News International.

Brooks reappointed as CEO
In September 2015, Brooks was reappointed as CEO of the company, now named News UK.

Operations
The company's major titles are published by subsidiary companies, Times Newspapers Ltd and News Group Newspapers. Until 2010, these newspapers were written at a large site in Wapping in east London, near Tower Hill, which earned the nickname "Fortress Wapping" after a fierce dispute with the union to which the workforce had previously belonged. The printing of the papers is now undertaken at plants in Waltham Cross, Knowsley, and Lanarkshire (the latter said by Rupert Murdoch, on the plant's opening in 2007, to be "the largest and fastest print press in the world").

The News Building, where all of News UK's London operations are based, was opened on 16 September 2014 by the Mayor of London, Boris Johnson.

Times Newspapers Ltd
Times Newspapers Limited publishes the compact daily newspaper The Times and the broadsheet The Sunday Times.

Times Newspapers was formed in 1967 when the Thomson Corporation purchased The Times from the Astor family and merged it with The Sunday Times, which it had owned since 1959. The company was purchased by Rupert Murdoch's News International in February 1981. The acquisition followed an intense 21 days of negotiations with the print unions, conducted by John Collier and Bill O'Neill. The Times Literary Supplement, Times Educational Supplement and Times Higher Education Supplement were also part of the group; the latter two publications have since been sold.

An American edition of The Times was launched in New York City, Boston and some other East Coast U.S. cities in 2006.

Rupert Murdoch has stated that the law and the independent board prevent him from exercising editorial control. However, an article in The Spectator following the resignation of James Harding stated that the trust has "never played much of a role in the 30 years Murdoch has owned the paper", and suggested that Murdoch had pressurised Harding to resign.

News Group Newspapers Ltd
News Group Newspapers Ltd publishes the tabloid newspaper The Sun. The News of the World was another tabloid newspaper owned by the company; however, its closure was announced on 7 July 2011, following new evidence about a phone hacking scandal at the newspaper. The final issue was released on 10 July 2011.

The News of the World was purchased by Murdoch in January 1969. The Sun was acquired in October 1969 from International Publishing Corporation.

Murdoch states that he acts as a "traditional proprietor"; exercising editorial control on major issues, such as which political party to back in a general election or policy on Europe.

NI Free Newspapers Limited
The London Paper was the first newspaper to be launched by News International rather than bought. It was an evening freesheet distributed at bus and rail stations in London. It was published five days a week from September 2006 to September 2009, when it closed down, faced with competition from other free papers.

Wireless Group Limited
In 2016, News UK acquired Wireless Group Limited, the operator of a number of radio stations across the United Kingdom and Ireland.

TalkTV

In December 2020, Ofcom granted a licence to News UK & Ireland Limited to operate a new television channel on satellite and cable (not to be confused with Andrew Neil's GB News, which is a separate news channel launched in June 2021). News UK TV was then overseen by David Rhodes, who was previously a Fox News executive and president of CBS News.

Unlike GB News, News UK TV is not expected to take up a slot on Freeview with its nightly programming (expected to be a few hours a night, according to Andrew Neil on BBC Radio 4's The Media Show, 12 March 2021) being streamed via a number of platforms.

In April 2021, News UK CEO Rebekah Brooks announced that plans for the new service had been much reduced, as a British equivalent of Fox was considered unviable, and programming would only be available via streaming. David Rhodes is to return to the United States in June.

In September 2021, a few days after Neil resigned as chairman of rival GB News, it was reported that the News UK's channel would now be called TalkTV (after the radio stations TalkRadio and talkSport) and that Piers Morgan would be a presenter on the new service. In addition, News UK have decided that TalkTV would be available on FreeSat, Freeview, Sky UK and Virgin Media (if slots can be acquired by the company) and that the channel would feature current affairs documentaries, programmes about sport and entertainment features.

Other
 News International (Advertisements) Limited
 News International Associated Services Limited
 News International Distribution Limited
 News Ireland 
 News Printers (Knowsley) Limited
 News Printers (Scotland) Limited
 News International Pension Trustees Limited
 News International Supply Company Limited
 News International Television Investment Company Limited
 News International Television Limited
 NI Syndication Limited
 The Fifth – Influencer Marketing Agency

See also
 Metropolitan police role in phone hacking scandal
 News Corp Australia
 News International phone hacking scandal
 Phone hacking scandal reference lists
 List of companies based in London

References

External links
News UK

 
British companies established in 1981
Publishing companies established in 1981
Newspaper companies of the United Kingdom
News Corporation subsidiaries